Stefan Radovanović (born 19 February 1992) is a Serbian football defender who plays for Qrendi.

Club career
Radovanović passed the youth school of Red Star Belgrade. Later he played for Zemun, Mladost Lučani, Mogren and Mornar Bar for two times, but he was with Borac Čačak in the meantime. In summer 2015, Radovanović moved in Dinamo Vranje from Sloga Požega. Beginning of 2016, he joined the Serbian SuperLiga club Radnik Surdulica.

Qrendi

References

External links
 
 Stefan Radovanović stats at utakmica.rs
 Stefan Radovanović stats at footballdatabase.eu
 Stefan Radovanović at MFA

1992 births
Living people
Serbian footballers
Serbian expatriate footballers
Association football defenders
FK Zemun players
FK Mladost Lučani players
FK Mogren players
FK Mornar players
FK Borac Čačak players
FK Sloga Požega players
FK Dinamo Vranje players
FK Radnik Surdulica players
OFK Petrovac players
FK Novi Pazar players
Tarxien Rainbows F.C. players
Pietà Hotspurs F.C. players
Montenegrin First League players
Serbian First League players
Serbian SuperLiga players
Maltese Premier League players
Serbian expatriate sportspeople in Montenegro
Serbian expatriate sportspeople in Malta
Expatriate footballers in Montenegro
Expatriate footballers in Malta